Mark Lee Urban (born 26 January 1961) is a British journalist, historian, and broadcaster, and is currently the Diplomatic Editor and occasional presenter for BBC Two's Newsnight.

His older brother is the film-maker Stuart Urban.

Education and early career

Urban's father came from Poland, but Mark was born in England. Educated at the independent day schools Rokeby School and King's College School in Wimbledon, South London, he continued his education at the London School of Economics.

After graduation, he served in the British Army, for nine months as a regular officer in the Royal Tank Regiment on a Short Service Limited Commission and for four years in the Territorial Army.

Correspondent career

Urban joined the BBC in 1983 as an assistant producer, working on several BBC news programmes. From 1986 to 1990 he was the defence correspondent of The Independent, before rejoining the BBC as a general reporter on Newsnight. From 1993 to 1994 he was Middle East correspondent for BBC News, before becoming Newsnights diplomatic editor, a role he has held since 1995. He has at times been an embedded reporter, first with British and then U.S. troops.

In his years on Newsnight, he has reported on many of the most compelling foreign news stories in the past two decades: the Gulf War; the attempted coup d'état of 1991 in Moscow; 1993 events in Moscow; Bosnian War; Middle East peace process; the War in Kosovo; and the recent US military campaigns in War in Afghanistan and War in Iraq.

In 2009 Urban received a Peace Through Media Award from the International Council for Press and Broadcasting.

After the 2018 Amesbury poisonings Urban reported that he was working with Sergei Skripal up to a year before the poisoning of Sergei and Yulia Skripal in Salisbury.

Military historian
In 1992, Urban published Big Boys' Rules: The SAS and the secret struggle against the IRA on killings by British Army and Royal Ulster Constabulary undercover units in Northern Ireland between 1976 and 1987. The book, which was subject to censorship by the D-Notice Committee, was described by John Stalker as "deep and meticulous delving into a secret war".

In 2001, he published his first book on the Napoleonic Wars, The Man Who Broke Napoleon's Codes: The Story of George Scovell, which weaves together first-hand accounts of the war and narrative. His second narrative history, Rifles: Six Years with Wellington's Legendary Sharpshooters, published in 2003, continues the story of the Iberian campaign, through the history of the 95th Rifles. His study of the Royal Welch Fusiliers followed the same pattern as his earlier successes, combining first-hand accounts with an overarching narrative.

In 2010, he published Task Force Black: The Explosive True Story of the SAS and the Secret War in Iraq,  described as a "ground-breaking investigation" and which required months of negotiations with the Ministry of Defence who had tried to prevent publication.

Books
Soviet Land Power (1985) 
War in Afghanistan (1987) 
Big Boys' Rules: The SAS and the secret struggle against the IRA (1992) 
UK Eyes Alpha: Inside British Intelligence (1996) 
The Man Who Broke Napoleon's Codes: The Story of George Scovell (2001) 
Rifles: Six Years with Wellington's Legendary Sharpshooters (2003) 
Generals: Ten British Commanders Who Shaped the World (2005) 
Fusiliers: Eight Years with the Redcoats in America (2007) 
Task Force Black: The Explosive True Story of the Secret Special Forces War in Iraq (2011) 
The Tank War: The British Band of Brothers - One Tank Regiment's World War II (2014) 
The Edge: Is The Military Dominance Of The West Coming To An End? (2015) 
The Skripal Files: The Life and Near Death of a Russian Spy (2018)

References

External links
Profile at BBC Newsnight
Newsnight at war, 2 February 2005

1961 births
Military personnel from London
British male journalists
Living people
British military historians
People from Marylebone
People educated at King's College School, London
Historians of the Napoleonic Wars
Royal Tank Regiment officers